In resource management, pooling is the grouping together of resources (assets, equipment, personnel, effort, etc.) for the purposes of maximizing advantage or minimizing risk to the users. The term is used in finance, computing and equipment management.

Finance
Pooling is the grouping together of assets, and related strategies for minimizing risk. For example:
Asset-backed securities (ABS) is a security whose income payments are backed by a specified pool of underlying assets. 
Mortgage-backed securities (MBS) is a type of Asset-backed security whereas the underlying assets are mortgages.

Debt instruments with similar characteristics can be pooled into a new security, for example:
Collateralized debt obligations (CDO) is a type of structured asset-backed security (ABS).
Collateralized mortgage obligations (CMO) is a type of complex debt security that repackages and directs the payments of principal and interest from a collateral pool to different types and maturities of securities, thereby meeting investor needs.

In general, pooling different assets or debt-like obligations into a new security is called Securitization, a practice commonly used by Structured finance.

Accounting
Pooling-of-interests was a merger-accounting method that was taken out of the market in the United States by the Financial Accounting Standards Board on June 30, 2001.

Supply chain management
Intergovernmental risk pool

Computing
Pooling IT (equipment and staff) resources involves virtualization of typical IT stacks server, storage and networking (but also on the level of datacenter power and cooling).  Users benefit from lower individual investments since resources are shared.  Although shared infrastructures have huge benefits potential issues on the environment have impact on the complete environment. A thorough analysis of the infrastructure is recommended to identify potential single point of failure (SPOF). One may opt for 'private' instances (private clouds) for specific needs or for specific reasons.  On the level of resource pooling, bigger suppliers tend to have the benefit of being able to provide shared support environments with round the clock service.  Do you prefer access to a service desk round the clock with potential less expertise or do you want to rely on a single support engineer (who is 'on duty' during off peak hours)"
Memory pooling
Thread pooling
Object pooling
Connection pooling in computer science is a caching technique used to enhance the performance of executing commands on a database.

The resource management concepts of pooling can easily be abstracted and virtualized.

Equipment
Pooling of equipment is used to maintain "ready for use" equipment while damaged or dirty equipment is repaired and cleaned, by replacing it with an identical piece of equipment from the pool.

Automotive
Carpooling

See also

Pool (disambiguation)

References

Resource economics